The 2013–14 FK Austria Wien season was the 102nd season in club history. Austria Wien will participate, in the Bundesliga; the Austrian Cup; and the UEFA Champions League, where they began in the third qualifying round.

Background

Background information
Austria Wien won the 2012–13 Bundesliga. As champions, Austria Wien entered the third qualifying round of the UEFA Champions League. Austria Wien also participated in the Bundesliga and the Austrian Cup. Peter Stöger left Austria Wien to become head coach of German 2. Bundesliga club 1. FC Köln on 11 June. Nenad Bjelica succeeded Stöger on 17 June. The players reported for pre–season on 18 June.

Transfers

In

Out

Bundesliga

Bundesliga review

Matchdays 1 – 9
Austria Wien began their Bundesliga campaign on 20 July against Admira Wacker Mödling. Austria Wien won 2–0 with goals from Philipp Hosiner and Marko Stanković. Austria Wien finished the first matchday in second place.  Austria Wien faced Red Bull Salzburg in the Bundesliga on matchday two on 27 July. Red Bull Salzburg won 5–1. Alexander Grünwald scored for Austria Wien. Jonathan Soriano, Alan, Kevin Kampl and André Ramalho Silva scored for Red Bull Salzburg. Kevin Kampl scored two of the goals. Austria Wien finished July in sixth place in the table. Austria Wien started August with matchday three of the Bundesliga against SV Ried on 3 August. The match ended in a 3–3 draw. Marko Stanković (two goals) and Tomáš Jun scored for Austria Wien. René Gartler, Oliver Kragl and Furkan Aydogdu scored for Ried. Austria Wien remained in sixth place in the table. Austria Wien faced Rapid Wien on matchday four on 11 August. This was the 306th Wiener Derby. The match ended in a 0–0 draw. Austria Wien finished the matchday in sixth place. Austria Wien faced Wiener Neustadt on matchday five on 17 August. Austria Wien won 5–0 with goals from Alexander Gorgon, Tomáš Jun, Philipp Hosiner and Marko Stanković. Hosiner scored two goals. Austria Wien finished the matchday in fifth place. Austria Wien faced Wolfsberger AC on matchday six on 25 August. Austria Wien won 4–1. Daniel Royer, Alexander Grünwald, Marko Stanković and Roman Kienast scored for Austria Wien. Dario Baldauf scored for Wolfsberg. Austria Wien finished the matchday in fourth place.

Austria Wien finished August with matchday seven of the Bundesliga on 31 August against Wacker Innsbruck. The match ended as a 1–1 draw. Austria Wien had not scored against Wacker in 656 minutes. Rubin Okotie scored for Austria Wien and Lukas Hinterseer scored for Wacker Innsbruck. Austria Wien Finished August in fourth place. Austria Wien started September with matchday 8 of the Bundesliga against Grödig 14 September. Austria Wien lost 3–2. Austria Wien got goals from Marko Stanković and Daniel Royer. Grödig's goalscorers were Mario Leitgeb and Philipp Huspek. Mario Leitgeb scored two goals. Austria Wien finished the matchday in fifth place. The following day, Alexander Grünwald suffered an Anterior cruciate ligament injury during training.

Austria Wien faced Sturm Graz on matchday nine on 21 September. Austria Wien won 2–1. Philipp Hosiner and Marko Stanković scored for Austria Wien and Daniel Beichler scored for Sturm Graz. Austria Wien finished the matchday in fourth place. An MRI on 23 September showed that Stanković had a torn muscle in the calf and would "miss several weeks".

Matchdays 10–18
Austria Wien finished September with matchday 10 against Admira Wacker Mödling on 28 September. Admira won 1–0 with a goal from René Schicker. Austria Wien finished the matchday fifth in the table. Austria Wien faced Red Bull Salzburg on matchday 11 on 6 October. Red Bull Salzburg won 2–1. Daniel Royer scored for Austria Wien. Sadio Mané and Alan scored for Red Bull Salzburg. Austria Wien remained in fifth place. Austria Wien faced SV Ried on matchday 12 on 19 October. The match ended in a 1–1 draw. Philipp Hosiner scored for Austria Wien and Julius Perstaller scored for Ried. Austria Wien finished the matchday in fifth place. Austria Wien finished October with matchday 13 against Rapid Wien on 27 October. This was the 307th Wiener Derby. Rapid Wien won 1–0 with a goal from Terrence Boyd. The loss ended a 10–match undefeated streak ended against Rapid Wien. Austria Wien finished October in fifth place. 

Austria Wien started November with matchday 14 against Wiener Neustadt on 3 November. Austria Wien won 3–0 with three goals from Roman Kienast. Austria Wien finished the matchday in fifth place. Austria Wien faced Wolfsberg on matchday 15 on 9 November. Austria Wien won 1–0 with a goal from Thomas Murg. Austria Wien finished the matchday in fourth place. Austria Wien faced Wacker Innsbruck on matchday 16 on 23 November. Austria Wien won 5–0 with goals from Philipp Hosiner, Thomas Murg, and Markus Suttner. Philipp Hosiner scored three goals. Austria Wien finished the matchday in third place. Austria Wien finished November with matchday 17 against Grödig. Grödig won 1–0 with a goal from Stefan Nutz. Austria Wien finished November in fourth place. Austria Wien started December with matchday 18 against Sturm Graz on 3 December. Austria Wien won 3–2. Christian Ramsebner, Daniel Royer, and Philipp Hosiner scored for Austria Wien. Daniel Beichler and Manuel Weber scored for Sturm Graz. Austria Wien finished the matchday in third place.

Matchdays 19–27
Austria Wien faced Admira Wacker Mödling on matchday 19 on 7 December. The match ended in a 2–2 draw. Roman Kienast and Christian Ramsebner scored for Austria Wien. René Schicker scored two goals for Admira. Austria Wien finished the matchday in fourth place. Austria Wien faced Red Bull Salzburg on matchday 20 on 17 December. Red Bull Salzburg won 4–0 with goals from André Ramalho, Valon Berisha, Alan, and Sadio Mané. This was Austria Wien's third loss of the season against Red Bull Salzburg after losing 5–1 and 2–1 earlier in the season. Austria Wien finished the matchday in fourth place. Austria Wien finished December with matchday 21 against SV Ried on 18 December. The match ended in a 1–1 draw. Kaja Rogulj scored for Austria Wien and René Gartler scored for Ried. Austria Wien finished December in fourth place. Austria Wien returned to training on 7 January. David de Paula, Ola Kamara, and Thomas Salamon join Austria Wien during mid–season training. Rubin Okotie left on loan during mid–winter training. Tomáš Šimkovič, Marin Leovac and Dare Vršič were sold during mid-winter training. Austria Wien faced Rapid Wien on matchday 22 on 9 February, the 308th Wiener Derby. Rapid Wien won 3–1. David de Paula scored for Austria Wien. Rapid Wien's goals came from an own goal from Kaja Rogulj along with goals from Marcel Sabitzer and Mario Sonnleitner. This is Austria Wien's first lost at Gerhard Hanappi Stadium since 14 March 2010. Austria Wien finished the matchday in fifth place.

Austria Wien faced Wiener Neustadt on Matchday 23 on 15 February. The match ended in a 1–1 draw. Thomas Salamon scored for Austria Wien and Stefan Rakowitz scored for Wiener Neustadt. Austria Wien finished the match in fifth place. The following day, Nenad Bjelica was sacked as head coach along with assistant coach Rene Poms. Herbert Gager took over until the end of the season. He was head coach of the reserve team until that time. Andreas Ogris took over as reserve team coach until the end of the season until the end of the season. Austria Wien faced Wolfsberger AC on matchday 24 on 22 February. The match ended in a 0–0 draw. Austria Wien finished the matchday in fifth place. Austria Wien faced Wacker Innsbruck on matchday 25 on 1 March. Austria Wien won 2–1. Tomáš Jun (2 goals) scored for Austria Wien and Júnior Felício Marques scored for Wacker Innsbruck. Austria Wien finished the matchday in third place. Austria Wien faced SV Grödig on matchday 26 on 8 March. Austria Wien won 2–0 with goals from Philipp Hosiner and Alexander Gorgon.

Fixtures and results

League table

Results summary

Austrian Cup

Austrian Cup review

Austrian Cup The draw for the first round of the Austrian Cup and Austria Wien were drawn against SV Oberwart. The match against Oberwart was played on 12 July. Austria Wien won 3–0 with goals from Philipp Hosiner, Alexander Grünwald, and Marko Stanković. Heinz Lindner had "more or less nothing to do." The draw for the second round of the Austrian Cup happened on 7 August and Austria Wien were drawn against Kalsdorf. The match against Karlsdorf happened on 24 September. Austria Wien went into the match with seven players unavailable due to injury. Kalsdorf knocked out Austria Wien with a score of 2–1. Tomáš Jun scored for Austria Wien. Lukas Stadler and Rafael Dorn scored for Karlsdorf.

Austrian Cup results

Champions League

Champions League review
Austria Wien won the 2012–13 Bundesliga. As champions, Austria Wien entered the third qualifying round of Champions League. Austria Wien was involved in the Champions League draw for the third qualifying round. Austria Wien was drawn against the winner of FH and FK Ekranas from the second qualifying round. FH ended up advancing to face Austria Wien. The first leg happened on 30 July. Austria Wien won 1–0 from a goal from Daniel Royer. The second leg happened on 7 August. The match ended 0–0. Austria Wien won 1–0 on aggregate. Two days later, the draw for the play–off round of Champions League happened. Austria Wien were drawn against Dinamo Zagreb. The first leg was played on 21 August. Austria Wien won the first leg 2–0 with goals from Marin Leovac and Marko Stanković. The second leg was played on 27 August. Dinamo Zagreb won the match 3–2, but lost on aggregate 4–3. Florian Mader and Roman Kienast scored for Austria Wien. Marcelo Brozović, Junior Fernándes, and Fatos Bećiraj scored for Dinamo Zagreb.  This is the first time that Austria Wien qualified for the Group Stage of Champions League and the first Austrian club to qualify for the Group Stage since Rapid Wien qualified for the Group Stage in 2005. Two days later, the draw for the Champions League Group Stage took place. Austria Wien was drawn into Group G and would face Porto, Atlético Madrid, and Zenit Saint Petersburg. Austria Wien faced Porto on matchday one of the Champions League group stage. Porto won 1–0 from a goal from Lucho González. Austria Wien was in third place in the table after the completion of the first matchday. Austria Wien then faced Zenit Saint Petersburg 1 October. The match ended in a 0–0 draw. The draw is the first point that an Austrian club has earned in the Group Stage of Champions League since Sturm Graz defeated Panathinaikos on 20 February 2001. Austria Wien finished the matchday in third place. Austria Wien faced Atlético Madrid on 22 October. Atlético Madrid won 3–0 with goals from Raúl Garcia and Diego Costa. Diego Costa scored two goals. Austria Wien finished the matchday in fourth place. Austria Wien played Atlético Madrid on 6 November. Atlético Madrid won 4–0 with goals from Miranda, Raúl García, Filipe Luís and Diego Costa. Austria Wien finished the matchday in fourth place. Austria Wien faced Porto on 26 November. The match ended in a 1–1 draw. Roman Kienast scored for Austria Wien. This is the first time since 7 December 2005 that an Austrian Club has scored in the Group Stage. Jackson Martínez scored for Porto. Austria Wien finished the matchday in fourth place. With the draw, Austria Wien officially finished the group stage in last place and are completely eliminated from all European competitions. Austria Wien played their last match in the Group Stage on 11 December against Zenit Saint Petersburg. Austria Wien won 4–1. This was Austria Wien's first ever victory in the Group Stage of Champions League. This is also the first victory in the Group Stage of Champions League by an Austrian club since Sturm Graz defeated Panathinaikos 2–1 on 20 February 2001. Philipp Hosiner, Tomáš Jun, and Roman Kienast scored for Austria Wien. Philipp Hosiner scored two goals. Aleksandr Kerzhakov scored for Zenit  Saint Petersburg. Austria Wien finished the group in fourth and last place.

Champions League results

Qualifying and Play–off rounds results

Group stage

Table

Results

Table by matchday

Team statistics

Overall record

Record by head coach

Record vs. Opponent

Player information

Squad and statistics

Discipline

Awards
Heinz Lindner became Austrian footballer of the year on 2 February.

Notes
1.Kickoff time in Central European Time/Central European Summer Time.
2.Austria Wien goals listed first.
3.Statistics include 4 qualifying phase matches.
4.Players joined the club in January 2014.
5.Thomas Salamon is registered as no. 35 in the Bundesliga while Nikola Zivotic is registered as no. 35 with UEFA.

References

Austria Wien
2013-14 Austria Wien Season
Austria Wien